Panix Pass or Panixer Pass (Romansh: Pass dil Veptga, German: Panixerpass) (2404 m) is a Swiss Alpine pass between the cantons of Glarus and Graubünden.

The pass was once an important trade route between the canton of Glarus and Italy. It connects Elm in the Sernftal in Glarus with Pigniu (Panix) in the Vorderrhein valley of Graubünden. It is not passable by car.

In October 1799, Russian General Alexander Suvorov made a strategic retreat from the French Revolutionary forces south over the pass and regrouped his forces in Austria.

Gallery

See also
 List of mountain passes

References

External links

Mountain passes of Switzerland
Mountain passes of the Alps
Mountain passes of Graubünden
Mountain passes of the canton of Glarus
Glarus–Graubünden border